Oh Happy Band! is a BBC television sitcom written by David Croft and Jeremy Lloyd. The series ran for six episodes in 1980 on BBC 1, and featured the last screen appearance of comedian Harry Worth. For musical sequences, the series featured the Aldershot Brass Ensemble. Since broadcast, the series has not been repeated or released on any home consumer media.

Plot
Harry (Harry Worth) is the conductor of a brass band in the small (fictional) northern town of Nettlebridge. During the course of the series, he and his fellow band members become involved in a campaign to prevent the building of a new airport over their town.

Cast
Harry Worth as Mr. Beddington
Margaret Clifton as Miss Mayhew
Jonathan Cecil as Mr. Herbert
John Horsley as Mr. Braithwaite
Billy Burden as Mr. Sowerby
Tom Mennard as Mr. Pilgrim
Tony Sympson as Mr. Giles
Jan Holden as Mrs. Draper
Moira Foot as Glenda
Peggy Ann Clifford as Mrs. Tickford
Harold Bennett as Vicar

Episodes
A Bird in the Bush (3 September 1980)
Let Bygones Be Bygones (10 September 1980)
A Record to Be Proud of (17 September 1980)
Home Cure (24 September 1980)
A Song in the Air (1 October 1980)
Diplomatic Privilege (8 October 1980)

Reception
Mark Lewisohn, writing in the BBC Guide to Comedy writes: "An odd amalgam of ideas from established sitcom creators Lloyd and Croft...Considering the usual dependability of the major protagonists here, it is fair to say that Oh Happy Band! was flat rather than sharp."

References

External links

1980 British television series debuts
1980 British television series endings
BBC television sitcoms
David Croft sitcoms
English-language television shows
1980s British sitcoms